Harpagomorpha is a genus of millipede in the family Paradoxosomatidae containing a single species, H. dentata, known from the Nilgiri mountains, Southern India. H. dentata was originally described by Swiss zoologist Johann Carl in 1932 under the name Orthomorpha dentata, and transferred to its own genus by Dutch zoologist C. A. W. Jeekel in 1980.

References

Polydesmida
Endemic fauna of the Western Ghats
Millipede genera
Monotypic arthropod genera